Openvape (stylized as O.penVAPE) manufactures and distributes personal vaporizer devices for use with herbal extract oil-filled cartridges. Founded in 2012, the company is headquarter in Denver, Colorado, and sells products at many retail locations across a distribution network of licensed affiliates in many places of United States, Jamaica, Czech Republic, France,  Netherlands, United Kingdom, Canada, Poland,  Ireland, Scotland & also in South Africa.

O.penVAPE licenses its intellectual property to eleven distribution partners in ten states and Jamaica. Licensees employ O.penVAPE's Organa Labs technology and proprietary processes to manufacture cannabis oil using supercritical  extraction.

O.penVAPE's premium line of Craft RESERVE cartridges won the first place prize for Best Vape Pen Cartridge in the High Times 2016 Colorado Cannabis Cup competition.

In Europe, O.penVAPE branded products, with the exception of Organa Labs cannabis line, are available in the Czech Republic, France, the Netherlands and the United Kingdom. O.penVAPE is arguably the most globally recognized brand in the cannabis and personal vaporizer industries, reporting monthly sales of approximately 500,000 units in April 2015.

O.penVAPE is a founding member of the National Cannabis Industry Association and the company's leaders promote the legal and safer use of recreational marijuana. Its founders, being ardent supporters of medical cannabis as safe alternative medicine, hired a credentialed team of scientists to drive research and development. 
 
The Denver Department of Environmental Health appointed Ralph Morgan, CEO of O.penVAPE, to serve on its Cannabis Sustainability Work Group, in December 2015, to determine best practices and develop other educational resources for the industry.

In May 2016, the company submitted a bid to assume the naming rights of the Denver Broncos' stadium after Sports Authority declared bankruptcy.

The company partnered with the award-winning Green House Seed Co., based in Amsterdam, to develop a line of co-branded vape oil cartridges.

References

External links 
 O.penVAPE web site
 Organa Labs web site

Cannabis companies
Cannabis in Colorado
Electronic cigarette manufacturers
Manufacturing companies based in Denver